Walnut Creek is a river in Jewell County in the U.S. State of Kansas. Walnut Creek flows into the White Rock Creek northeast of the City of Burr Oak.

References

Rivers of Kansas
Rivers of Jewell County, Kansas